Akash Kusum ("Up in the Clouds") is a 1965 Bengali film directed by noted Indian parallel film director Mrinal Sen. The film was remade in 1979 in Hindi as Manzil.

Plot
It is the story of the longings of a middle class executive to rise in stature and greater social acceptability. The young man still trying to find a place in the corporate world puts up an innocent bluff to a young girl he chances upon.  His deception increases till they become disastrous for him, and for their relationship.

Cast
 Soumitra Chatterjee as Ajay
 Aparna Sen as Manika
 Subhendu Chatterjee
 Haradhan Bandopadhyay

References
On the Mrinal Sen website
A review

External links

1965 films
1965 drama films
1960s Indian films
Bengali-language Indian films
Films directed by Mrinal Sen
Films set in Kolkata
1960s business films
Indian business films
Bengali films remade in other languages
Best Bengali Feature Film National Film Award winners
1960s Bengali-language films